St. Mary Academy – Bay View is an all-girls Catholic school, serving girls and young women from pre-school through grade twelve. Bay View is located in Riverside, Rhode Island. It was founded by the Religious Sisters of Mercy in 1874. It is located in the Roman Catholic Diocese of Providence.

History
St. Mary Academy – Bay View was founded in 1874 by the Sisters of Mercy. From 1892 to 1910 Mary Matthew Doyle, founder and first president of Salve Regina University, taught at Bay View.

In the spring of 1991, the United States Department of Education recognized St. Mary Academy-Bay View as a Blue-Ribbon School of Excellence and the school was renewed as a Blue-Ribbon School of Excellence in 2002.

Campus
The St. Mary Academy – Bay View campus is  found on Pawtucket Avenue in Riverside, Rhode Island.  There are four buildings: St. Joseph Hall, Mercy Hall, McAuley Hall, and the Athletic Wellness Center.

Traditions

St. Mary Academy – Bay View the girls go to mass, go to retreats, and many more religious and fun activities. It is tradition for only seniors to wear tie-dye throughout the year.

Spirit Week
Spirit Week takes place in late September/early October and throughout the week, the Middle and Upper School students wear accessories of their class color and participate in various fun activities.

Newcomers' Welcome is the last day of spirit week.  Each class dresses in their assigned colors (Upper School: blue, green, pink, and red; Middle School: purple, yellow, and orange).  Seniors wear clothing that they tie-dyed at a previous party.  Out of respect and tradition, only seniors wear tie-dye.  The Upperclasswomen put on skits.

Athletics
2004: Division I Swim, State Champions; Cross Country, 4th in State
2005: Women's Hockey, State Champions
2006: Division I Basketball, State Champions
2007: Division I Swim, State Champions; Division I Basketball, State Runner-up; Division I Softball, State Champions; Division II Soccer, State Champions

2008: Division II Soccer, State Champions

2018: Division II Swim, Division Champions

Manhattan at the Bay
Since 1983, the Bay View Players of St. Mary Academy – Bay View have been performing a cabaret show at the school's annual Manhattan at the Bay event.  The show is the main attraction for this fundraising event, with all of the proceeds going directly to the school.  Over 100 St. Mary Academy – Bay View students participate in the performance as singers, dancers or members of the technical crew.  A small number of male students from local high schools supplement the cast. The show is directed by the school's Fine Arts faculty and supported by parent volunteers.  Students help build the sets and run the lighting and sound during the show.  Manhattan at the Bay includes six performances of the cabaret over one weekend, typically the last weekend of April or the first weekend of May.  In addition, supplemental fundraising events are held on campus throughout the weekend.

The Manhattan at the Bay cabaret production has contributed to St. Mary Academy – Bay View's reputation as one of the top theatre programs in the state.  Over the years, the Bay View Players have received numerous awards at the state Drama Festival.  They have performed at the Providence Performing Arts Center, the now-defunct Warwick Musical Theatre, and the American School in Paris.  The St. Mary Academy – Bay View Chamber Choir has also received considerable recognition: the group has performed in Italy and appeared as the backing choir for shows at the Providence Performing Arts Center, including the national tour of Joseph and the Amazing Technicolor Dreamcoat and for singers Judy Collins and Clay Aiken.

In 2013, Manhattan at the Bay and the Bay View Players Cabaret celebrate the 30th Anniversary of Cabaret.

Notable alumnae
Danielle Lacourse ('04), Miss Rhode Island USA 2007, 1st Runner-Up at Miss USA 2007
Elisabeth Hasselbeck ('95), Survivor (U.S. TV series) contestant; former co-host of ABC's The View.
Maureen McKenna Goldberg ('69), Justice of the Rhode Island Supreme Court.
Lt. Col. and Senator Martha McSally ('84), US Air Force pilot, first woman to fly a solo combat mission, highest ranking woman in the United States Air Force. She won suit against the Department of Defense after she was required to wear the body-covering abaya while stationed in Saudi Arabia. United States Senator from Arizona 2019–2020.
Eileen S. Naughton, Democratic member of the Rhode Island House of Representatives.
Olivia Culpo ('10), Miss Rhode Island USA 2012, Miss USA 2012, Miss Universe 2012.

Bay View in fiction
Bay View was referred to on the show Brotherhood, when a character's daughter attended "St. Mary's Academy at the Bay View". The portion of the show which occurred at "St. Mary's Academy at the Bay View" was filmed at Bay View.

See also

Bishop Keough Regional High School - Another all-girls' school in Rhode Island
Catholic schools in the United States
Higher education
List of Rhode Island schools
Parochial school

Notes and references

External links
St. Mary Academy - Bay View website
Bay View Cabaret 25

Private middle schools in Rhode Island
Private elementary schools in Rhode Island
Private K-12 schools in the United States
Catholic secondary schools in Rhode Island
Schools in Providence County, Rhode Island
Girls' schools in Rhode Island
Educational institutions established in 1874
Buildings and structures in East Providence, Rhode Island
Sisters of Mercy schools
Roman Catholic Diocese of Providence
1874 establishments in Rhode Island